Al Wahda Dam, formerly known as M'Jaara Dam, is an embankment dam on the Ouergha River near M´Jaara in Taounate Province, Morocco. It was constructed for flood control, irrigation, water supply and hydroelectric power production. It is the second largest dam in Africa and the largest in Morocco. It was described by Land Ocean Interactions in the Coastal Zone (LOICZ) as "the second most important dam in Africa after the High Aswan dam."

Background
In 1988, the Board of Water and Climate considered the dam and eventually it was recommended for development. Construction began in 1991, the dam began to create its reservoir in 1996 and was inaugurated on March 20, 1997, by King Hassan II.

Specifications

Power plant

Impacts
The dam has had a positive impact downstream by supplying water for drinking and irrigation. In addition, it has helped reduce  floods in the Gharb region along the Ouergha and Sebou Rivers by 90%. The dam's reservoir though has a high rate of siltation and it is estimated to lose  of storage each year. The silt trapped in the reservoir also doesn't reach the coastal estuary which increases erosion along the coast.

See also

 List of power stations in Morocco

References

Dams completed in 1997
Energy infrastructure completed in 1998
Hydroelectric power stations in Morocco
Dams in Morocco
Earth-filled dams
20th-century architecture in Morocco